Khur (also Romanized as Khūr, Khvor, and Khoor) is a city in the Central District of Larestan County, Fars Province, Iran.  At the 2006 census, its population was 6,370, in 1,360 families.

Overview 
Khour is a 400-year-old city located in southern part of Fars province.  People of Khour speak Khoury language (Local Language which is also called "Achomi") and Persian.  In terms of the geographical situation, the city is 300 km away from Shiraz.

Demographics 

Males constitute 50% of the population and females 50%.  Khour has an average literacy rate of 70%, higher than the national average of 59.5%: male literacy is 78%, and female literacy is 62%.  In Khour, 13% of the population is under 6 years of age.  In term of Religion, 100% percent of people are Muslim Sonnies.  Most of the men are either self-employed or employees in Gulf Countries such as, United Arab Emirates, Qatar and so on. 
to be added: 10 to 20% of them are local in UAE and Qatar which some never ever has seen their hometown at all just handling the Khoury name on their family
and it should be said they are well respected and known there. Some are working for government and some are rich enough to have major businesses. It has such hot and dry weather during summer and cold dry during winter. In order to have rain specially during summer which starts at the second month of summer as it is known as chel pasini (forty afternoons).

For more information about city of KHOUR you can use Google EARTH software or even Google maps and apply the keyword "Khoor" so you would be able to have a virtual tour to Khour through Google Earth, also you can use this link:

References

External links 

 Khour website 
  Khour City 
  Achomi Community 

Populated places in Larestan County
Cities in Fars Province